Milene Domingues Aganzo (born 18 June 1979) is a Brazilian former footballer who played as a midfielder.

Career
Born in São Paulo, Domingues played in a promotional futsal team of models run by the Flash Book modeling agency. In 1994 this team formed the basis of a new SC Corinthians women's team. She finished her playing career with CF Pozuelo de Alarcón. The ex-model holds the women's record for ball juggling. Until the £400,000 transfer of Keira Walsh to Barcelona in 2022, Domingues was the most expensive female football player in Spain, costing over £200,000, and second in the world behind Pernille Harder, who cost £250,000.

At international level she was included in the Brazil women's national football team for the 2003 FIFA Women's World Cup. Her inclusion was somewhat surprising and coach Paulo Gonçalves emphasised that she was not a first choice: "Milene is going with us, but she is between the 19th and 20th player." She remained an unused substitute in all four matches as Brazil were eliminated in the quarter finals.

She did participate in Brazil's next match in April 2004, under their new coach René Simões, an unofficial friendly against Texas A&M Aggies women's soccer at Aggie Soccer Stadium.

Personal life
She was married to football star Ronaldo from April 1999 to September 2003. Together they have one son, Ronnie, who was born in Milan, on 6 April 2000. Later, Domingues married Spanish footballer David Aganzo. She is a Buddhist.

References

External links
 Official site

1979 births
Living people
Brazilian Buddhists
Footballers from São Paulo
Brazilian women's footballers
Women's association football midfielders
Brazilian expatriate women's footballers
Brazilian expatriate sportspeople in Spain
Association footballers' wives and girlfriends
Expatriate women's footballers in Italy
Expatriate women's footballers in Spain
Primera División (women) players
Rayo Vallecano Femenino players
Serie A (women's football) players
Brazil women's international footballers
Freestyle footballers
Brazilian expatriate sportspeople in Italy
ASD Fiammamonza 1970 players
2003 FIFA Women's World Cup players
Sport Club Corinthians Paulista (women) players
CF Pozuelo de Alarcón Femenino players
AD Torrejón CF Femenino players